Tall Babineh (also Romanized as Tall Bābīneh; also known as Bābūneh, Tall Bābūneh, and Tol Bābūneh) is a village in Charam Rural District, in the Central District of Charam County, Kohgiluyeh and Boyer-Ahmad Province, Iran. At the 2006 census, its population was 253, in 41 families.

References 

Populated places in Charam County